Stein Olaf Sando  is a Norwegian handball player.

He made his debut on the Norwegian national team in 1995, 
and played 59 matches for the national team between 1995 and 2000. He participated at the 1997 World Men's Handball Championship.

References

Year of birth missing (living people)
Living people
Norwegian male handball players